Bonanza Campout Music Festival is an annual music festival held at River's Edge in Heber, Utah. The inaugural year of the festival, which was held on June 10–11, 2016, was headlined by several artists, including: Big Gigantic, Cold War Kids, Emancipator, Savoy and JR JR. The festival boasted 31 artists and two stages: The Bonanza Stage and The Shade Stage. On January 17, 2017, Bonanza Campout announced its official 2017 lineup, featuring headliners of ODESZA, Ms. Lauryn Hill, Nas, and Nick Murphy (FKA Chet Faker).

Musical acts

2016 
On April 18, 2016, Bonanza Campout announced its inaugural lineup, featuring Big Gigantic, Cold War Kids, Emancipator, Savoy and JR JR as headliners.

Friday, June 10, 2016
Big Gigantic
Emancipator
JR JR
Milo Greene
Ryan Hemsworth
Vacationer
Young Empires
New Beat Fund
Cale and the Gravity Well
Lionize
Doe
Quiet Oaks
Scenic Byway
The Departures
Legacy Music Alliance

Saturday, June 11, 2016
Cold War Kids
Savoy
Louis the Child
Joywave
Jamie N Commons
Parade of Lights
Secret Weapons
Manic Focus
Joshua James
Kyle Bent
Clyde Burnswell
Le Voir
High Octane
Joel Pack & The Pops
Red Dog Revival
Daisy & The Moonshines

2017 
On January 17, 2017, Bonanza Campout announced its official 2017 lineup, featuring headliners of ODESZA, Ms. Lauryn Hill, Nas, and Nick Murphy (FKA Chet Faker).

Below is the lineup listed in the order as they appear on the official lineup poster, as of May 13, 2017:

ODESZA
Ms. Lauryn Hill
Nas
Nick Murphy (FKA Chet Faker)
Cut Copy
Airborne Toxic Event
Wale
KONGOS
Duke Dumont
MUTEMATH
CHERUB
Bob Moses
Jai Wolf
Method Man
Redman
LANY
Slow Magic
Big Wild
Waka Flocka Flame
EDEN
The Knocks
TOKiMONSTA
Robert DeLong
FRENSHIP
Kaiydo
Harrison Brome
R.LUM.R
Michl
Chet Porter
Honors
The Moth & The Flame
Kiev
Kyle Bent
SECRETS
Avalon Landing
Cale & The Gravity Well
oCeLoT

References

External links
 Official Website Homepage

Rock festivals in the United States
Music festivals in Utah